The Association of European Operational Research Societies (EURO) is a regional grouping within the International Federation of Operational Research Societies (IFORS) whose aim is to promote Operational Research throughout Europe. It was established in 1975.

Overview
EURO is a nonprofit organization domiciled in Switzerland. It aims at the advancement of knowledge, interest and education in Operational Research by appropriate means, particularly by the exchange of information, the holding of meetings and conferences, the publication of books, papers, and journals, the
awarding of prizes, and the promotion of early stage talents. The members of EURO are national Operational Research Societies which are full members of International Federation of Operational Research Societies (IFORS) and originate from Europe, the Middle East and Africa. Its affairs are regulated by a Council consisting of one representatives of all its members and an executive committee which constitutes its board of directors.

The current EURO member societies are:

 Austria
 Belarus
 Belgium
 Croatia
 Czech Republic
 Denmark
 Estonia
 Finland
 France
 Germany
 Greece
 Hungary
 Iceland
 Ireland
 Israel
 Italy
 Lithuania
 Netherlands
 Norway
 Poland
 Portugal
 Serbia
 Slovakia
 Slovenia
 South Africa
 Spain
 Sweden
 Switzerland
 Turkey
 Tunisia
 United Kingdom

Activities 
EURO publishes scholarly journals and books about operational research, and organizes international conferences. It also bestows Awards, supports working groups, and organizes educational meetings.

Publications 

EURO publishes 4 scholarly journals:
 European Journal of Operational Research
 EURO Journal on Computational Optimization
 EURO Journal on Decision Processes
 EURO Journal on Transportation and Logistics
and the book series EURO Advanced Tutorials in Operational Research.

Awards 

EURO bestows a number of prizes:
 EURO Gold Medal. The highest distinction within OR in Europe is conferred for an outstanding contribution to the OR science.
 Distinguished Service Award, a recognition of distinguished service to EURO, the Association of European Operational Research Societies and to the profession of OR.
 Excellence in Practice Award, to recognize outstanding accomplishments in the practice of OR.
 Doctoral Dissertation Award, to recognize the OR contributions of PhD students or scientists having less than two years research experience since completing a PhD.
 Prize for OR for the Common Good, to honour outstanding accomplishments of OR for solving social-oriented problems.
 EURO Award for the Best EJOR Papers, to recognize the best papers published in the European Journal of Operational Research.

Conferences and Meetings 
EURO organizes a number of different conferences and events throughout each year:
 The EURO-k Conferences are broadly oriented and can be organized in cooperation with other associations such as INFORMS.
 EURO Mini Conferences  have the objective of assembling a limited number of specialists around a specific theme. At most two EURO Mini Conferences can be supported each year.
 EWG Meetings are organized by each EURO Working Group.

Working Groups and Forums 
EURO Working Groups are the organizational framework provided by EURO to groups of researchers and practitioners interested in a specific operational research topic. Each EURO Working Group holds at least one meeting per year, organizes sessions at conferences, publishes special issues of OR journals, and organizes conferences or seminars. The European Working Group on Multiple Criteria Decision Aiding (EWG-MCDA), the European Chapter on Combinatorial Optimization (ECCO), the European Working Group on Vehicle Routing and Logistics (VeRoLog), the EURO Working Group on Locational Analysis (EWGLA), the Continuous Optimization Working Group (EUROPT), and the European Working Group on Metaheuristics (EU/ME) are among the most active groups.

EURO Forums are groups tasked with progressing a specific initiative that supports the ongoing health and vitality of OR research and practice. A EURO Forum differentiates itself from a EURO Working Group by promoting the health and vitality of OR without tying itself to a specific research domain or methodology.
As of 2023, EURO has three forums:
 WISDOM (Women In Society: Doing Operational Research and Management Science)
 EUROYoung
 EURO Practitioners' Forum

Education 
EURO organizes educational meetings throughout each year:
 EURO PhD Schools are an instrument to encourage the organization of post-graduate education initiatives for PhD students under a school format.
 EURO Summer/Winter Institutes provide an opportunity for around 25 early stage researchers to meet for about two weeks. Participants present their material, discuss it with others and with a handful of specially invited senior experts in the field, and finally prepare a paper to be considered for inclusion in a feature issue of an OR publication.

Past Presidents 

 1975-1978 - Hans-Jürgen Zimmermann
 1979-1980 - Birger Rapp
 1981-1982 - Rolfe Tomlinson
 1983-1984 - Jean-Pierre Brans
 1985-1986 - Bernard Roy
 1987-1988 - Dominique de Werra
 1989-1990 - Jakob Krarup
 1991-1992 - Jaap Spronk
 1993-1994 - Maurice Shutler
 1995-1996 - Paolo Toth
 1997-1998 - Jan Węglarz
 1999-2000 - Christoph Schneeweiß
 2001-2002 - Philippe Vincke
 2003-2004 - Laureano Escudero
 2005-2006 - Alexis Tsoukiàs
 2007-2008 - Martine Labbé
 2009-2010 - Valerie Belton
 2011-2012 - M. Grazia Speranza
 2013-2014 - Gerhard Wäscher
 2015-2016 - Elena Fernández
 2017-2018 - Richard Eglese
 2019-2020 - Immanuel Bomze
 2021-2022 - Marc Sevaux
 2023-2024 - Anita Schöbel

References

External links 
 

Operations research societies
International scientific organizations
International organisations based in Switzerland